Acta Oto-Laryngologica is a peer-reviewed medical journal covering otolaryngology and head & neck surgery. It presents papers on clinical practice, clinical research, and basic sciences. It is published by Taylor and Francis Group. As of 2023 the editor-in-chief is Matti Anniko (Uppsala University).

External links 
 

Publications established in 1918
Otorhinolaryngology journals
Taylor & Francis academic journals
English-language journals
Monthly journals